Anton Hafner (2 June 1918 − 17 October 1944) was a German Luftwaffe military aviator during World War II and a fighter ace credited with 204 enemy aircraft shot down in 795 combat missions. The majority of his victories were claimed on the Eastern Front, but he also claimed 20 victories over the Western Front during the North African Campaign.

Born in Erbach an der Donau, Hafner grew up in the Weimar Republic and Nazi Germany. Following the compulsory Reich Labour Service, he was conscripted into military service with the Luftwaffe of the Wehrmacht. In February 1941 he was posted to Jagdgeschwader 51 (JG 51—51st Fighter Wing), flying his first combat missions against the Royal Air Force on the English Channel. Hafner claimed his first aerial victory on 24 June 1941 during Operation Barbarossa, the German invasion of the Soviet Union. Following his 60th aerial victory, he was awarded the Knight's Cross of the Iron Cross on 23 August 1942. His unit was then transferred to Tunisia in North Africa where he claimed 20 aerial victories. Back on the Eastern Front in August 1943, he was awarded the Knight's Cross of the Iron Cross with Oak Leaves on 11 April 1944 after achieving 134 aerial victories. On 15 May 1944, he was appointed squadron leader of 8. Staffel (8th squadron) of JG 51. Hafner claimed his 204th and last aerial victory on 17 October 1944. During this encounter, he flew into a tree, killing him.

Early life and career
Hafner, the son of a Meister, a master craftsman, in the field of tinsmith, was born on 2 June 1918 in Erbach an der Donau in the Kingdom of Württemberg of the German Empire. Following the compulsory Reich Labour Service, he was conscripted into military service with the Luftwaffe of the Wehrmacht. Following flight and fighter pilot training, he was transferred to 6. Staffel (6th squadron) of Jagdgeschwader 51 (JG 51—51st Fighter Wing) on 23 February 1941.

World War II
Hafner had been posted to 6. Staffel, a squadron of II. Gruppe (2nd group) of JG 51, one and a half years after the start of World War II. The unit had just undergone a period of replenishment and rest at Mannheim-Sandhofen and was being redeployed to an airfield at Mardyck, west of Dunkirk on the Channel Front. Hafner flew his first combat missions in this theater of operations. On 29 March 1941, he made a forced landing in his Messerschmitt Bf 109 E-4 (Werknummer 3766—factory number) and sustained minor injuries. On 1 June, II. Gruppe was withdrawn from the Channel Front and moved to Dortmund for conversion to the Bf 109 F-2 and preparation for Operation Barbarossa, the German invasion of the Soviet Union. Deployment east began on 10 June where II. Gruppe was initially based at Siedlce, familiarizing themselves with the Bf 109 F-2, and patrolling the border along the Bug River. The German attack began on the early morning on 22 June with II. Gruppe flying fighter escort missions in support of the German advance. The Gruppe was moved to an airfield at Terespol in the afternoon on 23 June. The next day, Hafner claimed his first aerial victory, a Tupolev SB bomber. On 3 July he claimed 5th aerial victory and was awarded the Iron Cross 2nd Class on 6 July and the Iron Cross 1st Class on 18 July.

Hafner was awarded the German Cross in Gold on 22 May 1942. He became an "ace-in-a-day" for the first time on 6 July 1942 when he shot down seven enemy aircraft, aerial victories 35–41. On 22 August, he claimed his 60th aerial victory and was nominated for the Knight's Cross of the Iron Cross which was awarded to him on 23 August.

North Africa
II. Gruppe had been withdrawn from the Eastern Front in early October 1942 and sent to Jesau near Königsberg in East Prussia, present day Yushny, Bagrationovsky District, for conversion to the Focke-Wulf Fw 190. Conversion training began on 7 October and on 4 November, the unit received the order to convert back to the Bf 109 and to transfer to the Mediterranean theatre. Via various stopovers, II. Gruppe moved to Sidi Ahmed airfield, arriving on 14 November. There, the unit was subordinated to Fliegerführer Tunis (Flying Leader Tunis). Two days later, on fighter escort mission for III. Gruppe (3rd group) of Zerstörergeschwader 2 (ZG 2—2nd Destroyer Fighter Wing), Hafner claimed his first victory in this theatre of operations.
The unit then moved to an airfield at El Aouina. On 18 December 1942, Hafner claimed two aerial victories over Lockheed P-38 Lightning  fighter aircraft, taking his total to 78 aerial victories. One of his opponents was Norman L. Widen of the United States Army Air Forces (USAAF) 94th Fighter Squadron. Widen bailed out and was taken prisoner of war and brought to Hafner's airfield. After Hafner landed, Widen presented Hafner his silver pilot insignia. Before Widen was taken to the prisoner-of-war camp, Hafner and Widen promised to meet again after the war. Hafner sent the gift to his brother, Alfons Hafner, with the request to return the gifts together with a medal and picture of Anton Hafner in case of Anton Hafner getting killed in action. In 1960 Alfons Hafner managed to contact Major Widen via the US Airforce to fulfil his brother's will. This story was published Life magazine on 14 April 1961.

On 2 January 1943, Hafner was shot down in his Bf 109 G-2 (Werknummer 13 985). It is believed that his victor may have been Bobby Oxspring. Hafner bailed out wounded, ending his service in North Africa. His injuries included a complex fracture of his arm. Following his convalescence, he was promoted to Leutnant (second lieutenant) on 1 June 1943.

Eastern Front and death
Hafner returned to JG 51 "Mölders" in August 1943, then operating on the Eastern Front. There, he was assigned to the Stabsstaffel (headquarters squadron). On 15 October 1943, the Soviet Central Front launched an offensive, attacking Army Group Centre on its southern flank at Loyew on the Dnieper. That day, Hafner was credited with his 100th aerial victory in that area of operations. He was the 56th Luftwaffe pilot to achieve the century mark. The Stabsstaffel had provided fighter escort to a flight of Heinkel He 111 bombers attacking ground targets in the vicinity of Gomel. On this mission, the Stabsstaffel ran into Soviet Douglas A-20 Havoc bombers, also known as Boston, which were protected by Lavochkin La-5 fighters. Hafner claimed two Bostons and a La-5 in this encounter. But his Fw 190 A-6 (Werknummer 530 373) also sustained battle damage, resulting in a forced landing on German held territory.

A barrel burst during combat with Petlyakov Pe-2 bombers on 29 March resulted in an emergency landing at Liuboml. Following his 134th aerial victory, Hafner was awarded the Knight's Cross of the Iron Cross with Oak Leaves on 11 April 1944, the 451st soldier to receive this distinction. The presentation was made by Adolf Hitler at the Berghof, Hitler's residence in the Obersalzberg of the Bavarian Alps, on 5 May 1944. Also present at the ceremony were Otto Kittel, Günther Schack, Alfred Grislawski, Emil Lang, Erich Rudorffer, Martin Möbus, Wilhelm Herget, Hans-Karl Stepp, Rudolf Schoenert, Günther Radusch, Otto Pollmann and Fritz Breithaupt, who all received the Oak Leaves on this date.

Hafner succeeded Hauptman Fritz Stendel as Staffelkapitän (squadron leader) of 8. Staffel (8th squadron) of JG 51 "Mölders" on 15 May. This squadron was redesignated as 10. Staffel (10th squadron) in August. On 24 June, the Soviet Air Forces fielded 4,500 combat missions over the combat area of Army Group Centre while Luftflotte 6 (Air Fleet 6) flew 111 ground attack and 150 fighter missions, creating a 1:15 discrepancy. That day, III. Gruppe flew several missions in the combat area south and southeast of Babruysk. During these missions, Hafner claimed aerial victories 140 to 144, thus becoming JG 51 "Mölders" most successful fighter pilot, a distinction he would hold until the end of World War II in Europe.

On 16 October 1944, Hafner destroyed four fighters thus taking him past the double century mark. Hafner's 204th and last victory was a Yakovlev Yak-7 fighter claimed on 17 October 1944. That day, JG 51 "Mölders" lost twelve aircraft in combat with the French Armée de l'Air Normandie-Niemen fighter regiment serving on the Eastern Front. He was the highest scoring pilot of JG 51 "Mölders". Hafner was replaced by Oberleutnant Helmut Besekau as commander of 10. Staffel.

Summary of career

Aerial victory claims
According to US historian David T. Zabecki, Hafner was credited with 204 aerial victories. Obermaier also lists Hafner with 204 aerial victories claimed in 795 combat missions, including 175 close air support missions. He claimed 184 victories over the Eastern Front. Of his 20 victories claimed over the Western Front, eight were P-38 two engine fighters and two were four-engined bombers.

Mathews and Foreman, authors of Luftwaffe Aces — Biographies and Victory Claims, researched the German Federal Archives and found records for 203 aerial victory claims, plus one further unconfirmed claim. This figure includes 184 aerial victories on the Eastern Front and 19 on the Western Front, including one four-engined bombers

Victory claims were logged to a map-reference (PQ = Planquadrat), for example "PQ 47654". These sectors were then subdivided into 36 smaller units to give a location area 3 × 4 km in size.

Awards
Iron Cross (1939)
 2nd Class (6 July 1941)
 1st Class (18 July 1941)
Honorary Cup of the Luftwaffe (27 April 1942)
German Cross in Gold on 22 May 1942 as Unteroffizier in the 6./Jagdgeschwader 51
Knight's Cross of the Iron Cross with Oak Leaves
 Knight's Cross on 23 August 1942 as Feldwebel and pilot in the 6./Jagdgeschwader 51 "Mölders"
 452nd Oak Leaves on 11 April 1944 as Leutnant (war officer) and pilot in the 6./Jagdgeschwader 51 "Mölders"

Notes

References

Citations

Bibliography

 
 
 
 
 
 
 
 
 
 
 
 
 
 
 
 
 
 
 
 
 
 
 
 

1918 births
1944 deaths
People from Alb-Donau-Kreis
People from the Kingdom of Württemberg
German World War II flying aces
Luftwaffe personnel killed in World War II
Luftwaffe pilots
Recipients of the Gold German Cross
Recipients of the Knight's Cross of the Iron Cross with Oak Leaves
Reich Labour Service members
Military personnel from Baden-Württemberg
Victims of aviation accidents or incidents in Germany